Yanling may refer to the following locations in China:

Yanling County (延陵縣) in Dai Commandery under the Han dynasty
Yanling County, Henan (鄢陵县), of Xuchang, Henan
Yanling County, Hunan (炎陵县), of Zhuzhou, Hunan
Yanling, Danyang, Jiangsu (延陵镇), town in Danyang City, Jiangsu